The Presiding Bishop of the Church of Jesus Christ of Latter-day Saints (LDS Church) is a priesthood calling with church-wide authority. The Presiding Bishop is the highest leadership position within the church's Aaronic priesthood.

Presiding Bishopric
Upon the Presiding Bishop's recommendation, the First Presidency calls two other men to assist the Presiding Bishop as his counselors; together these three compose the church's Presiding Bishopric. As well as being ordained to the Aaronic priesthood office of bishop, the members of the Presiding Bishopric are general authorities of the church.  Like all other functioning bishops in the church they are ordained high priests in the Melchizedek priesthood. The Presiding Bishopric forms the governing body of the Corporation of the Presiding Bishop of the Church of Jesus Christ of Latter-day Saints, which is the legal entity owning many of the church's assets and holdings in some countries around the world.

Duties 
The primary duties of the Presiding Bishopric are to oversee the temporal affairs (buildings, properties, commercial corporations, etc.) of the church and to oversee the bishoprics of congregations throughout the world. Along with the First Presidency and Quorum of the Twelve Apostles, the Presiding Bishopric is a part of the Council on the Disposition of the Tithes, a group that oversees and authorizes the expenditure of all tithing funds. The Presiding Bishopric is also responsible for overseeing the church's Aaronic priesthood, although most of the work in this area is delegated to the Young Men general presidency.

The Presiding Bishopric holds the power to join with twelve high priests of the church in convening the Common Council of the Church, the only body of the church which may discipline or remove the President of the Church or one of his counselors in the First Presidency. However, the Common Council has only been convened twice in the history of the LDS Church, and only once has it disciplined a First Presidency member, when Sidney Rigdon was excommunicated in absentia, in 1844.

History
The role of Presiding Bishop shares its origin with that of bishop. Edward Partridge was the first man ordained to the office of bishop in the early Church of Christ on February 4, 1831. Partridge became known as the First Bishop and later the "Presiding Bishop" to distinguish the calling from subordinate bishops who began to be called in the Nauvoo period (1839–44). The first person to be referred to as the "Presiding Bishop" of the church was Newel K. Whitney, who was given the title in 1847 when the First Presidency was reorganized.

Since beginning his term of service in 2015, the church's current Presiding Bishop is Gérald Caussé.

Possible other Presiding Bishop
According to Orson Pratt and John Taylor, Vinson Knight was made the Presiding Bishop, with Samuel H. Smith and Shadrach Roundy as assistants, on January 19, 1841. However, the LDS Church does not include Vinson Knight in its list of presiding bishops but considers Knight the "third general bishop of the Church."

Chronology of the Presiding Bishopric

Notes

Leadership positions in the Church of Jesus Christ of Latter-day Saints
Latter Day Saint hierarchy
1831 establishments in the United States
 
1831 in Christianity